Blue Sunshine may refer to:
 Blue Sunshine (album), the only album release by British group The Glove
 Blue Sunshine (film), a 1978 horror film
 "Blue Sunshine", a song by Blue October, from the album The Answers
 "Blue Sunshine", a song by B'z, from the album Green
Blue Sunshine, a song by The Meteors, from the album Wreckin' Crew